Bruce Alexander Turner (5 August 1930 – 30 March 2010) was a New Zealand field hockey player and cricketer.

He represented New Zealand in field hockey between 1950 and 1962, including at the 1956 Olympic Games in Melbourne and the 1960 Olympic Games in Rome. He represented Manawatu in hockey, and in 1976, when New Zealand won the Olympic gold medal, he was one of the national selectors.

He played 15 first-class cricket matches as an opening batsman for Central Districts between 1952 and 1956. He also represented Manawatu in the Hawke Cup from 1952 to 1968.

In 1956, Turner married netballer Thelma Trask, who represented New Zealand in 1948, and the couple had three children. Bruce Turner died on 30 March 2010.

References

External links

1930 births
2010 deaths
Sportspeople from Palmerston North
New Zealand male field hockey players
Olympic field hockey players of New Zealand
Field hockey players at the 1956 Summer Olympics
Field hockey players at the 1960 Summer Olympics
New Zealand cricketers
Central Districts cricketers
Cricketers from Palmerston North